N. Bhaskar Rao is an Indian politician from the state of Odisha. He is a leader of the Biju Janata Dal.  His hometown is Rayagada. He was also Deputy Chairman of Odisha state's planning board and is also an industrialist.

In 2016, he was the candidate of the party for the biennial Rajya Sabha elections. He was elected unopposed with Prasanna Acharya and Bishnu Charan Das.
Born on 23 July 1953 he completed his B.Com degree from Alagappa University of Tamil Nadu in 2008.

References

1953 births
Living people
Rajya Sabha members from Odisha
Biju Janata Dal politicians
People from Rayagada district